System of Government Under the Holy Prophet is a book written by Sayyid Abul Ala Maududi.

References

Books by Sayyid Abul Ala Maududi
Political systems